Sathasivam Viyalendiran (born 15 November 1978 ) is a Sri Lankan Tamil politician, Member of Parliament and state minister.

Early life
Viyalendiran was born on 15 November 1978. He was educated at Veppavettuvan Government Tami School, Chenkalady and Eruvar Tamil Maha Vidyalayam. After school he joined the Eastern University, Sri Lanka, graduating with a B.A. degree. He also holds a M.A. degree from the Madurai Kamaraj University.

Career
Viyalendiran is a member of the People's Liberation Organisation of Tamil Eelam (PLOTE). He contested the 2015 parliamentary election as one of the Tamil National Alliance electoral alliance's candidates in Batticaloa District and was elected to the Parliament.

During the 2018 Sri Lankan constitutional crisis Viyalendiran defected to the United People's Freedom Alliance government. He was rewarded by being appointed Deputy Minister of Regional Development (Eastern Development) in November 2018. He lost his position following the end of the crisis in December 2018.

Viyalendiran contested the 2020 parliamentary election as a Sri Lanka People's Freedom Alliance candidate in Batticaloa District and was re-elected to the Parliament of Sri Lanka. After the election he was appointed State Minister of Postal Services and Professional Development of Journalists. His portfolio was changed to State Minister of Backward Rural Areas Development and Promotion of Domestic Animal Husbandry and Minor Economic Crop Cultivation in October 2020.

Electoral history

References

1978 births
Alumni of the Eastern University, Sri Lanka
Democratic People's Liberation Front politicians
Deputy ministers of Sri Lanka
Living people
Madurai Kamaraj University alumni
Members of the 15th Parliament of Sri Lanka
Members of the 16th Parliament of Sri Lanka
People from Eastern Province, Sri Lanka
Sri Lanka People's Freedom Alliance politicians
Sri Lanka Podujana Peramuna politicians
Sri Lankan Tamil politicians
State ministers of Sri Lanka
Tamil National Alliance politicians